Seven Below (stylized as Se7en Below; US title Seven Below Zero) is a 2012 horror-thriller American film directed by Kevin Carraway starring Val Kilmer, Ving Rhames and Luke Goss in lead roles. Despite its similar name, it is not a sequel to the film Seven.

Premise
The story centers on a group of strangers trapped in a time warp house where a terrible event transpired exactly 100 years prior.

Cast

Production
The film was shot in Goshen, Ohio.

References

External links
 
 

2012 films
2012 direct-to-video films
2012 horror films
2012 horror thriller films
American horror thriller films
Direct-to-video horror films
Films shot in Ohio
2010s English-language films
2010s American films